Edith Cowan University (ECU) is a public university in Western Australia. It is named in honour of the first woman to be elected to an Australian parliament, Edith Cowan, and is the only Australian university named after a woman. Gaining university status in 1991, it was formed from an amalgamation of tertiary colleges with a history dating back to 1902 when the Claremont Teachers College was established, making it the modern descendant of the first tertiary institution in Western Australia.

Additionally, the university has partnerships with several education institutions to conduct courses and programs offshore. In 2020, the university enrolled over 31,000 students at undergraduate and postgraduate level, approximately 7,000 of whom were international students.

Its divisions include the Western Australian Academy of Performing Arts (WAAPA), a performing arts training academy; the School of Nursing and Midwifery, which offers a large undergraduate nursing program; the School of Education which offers a wide range of secondary teaching specialisations; and the Western Australian Screen Academy. The university also has a notable cybersecurity research and education program, being one of two federal Academic Centres of Cyber Security Excellence and the only Australian member university in the International Cyber Security Center of Excellence.

In the 2022 Good Universities Guide, ECU rated among the top three Australian universities for teaching quality, skills development, student support, student-to-teacher ratio, learning resources and overall experience. It was also one of two national universities to have maintained a 5-star rating in teaching quality for 15 years. The university is also a member of the Association of Commonwealth Universities, Association to Advance Collegiate Schools of Business, International Association of Law Schools and the International Cyber Security Center of Excellence.

History
In 1847, the General Board of Education was established to oversee school development in the Swan River Colony. After becoming the Central Board of Education, it was superseded by the then-called Education Department in 1893, which classified schools, graded teachers, defined teachers' positions, implemented a salary scale for teachers, abolished school fees, provided for co-educational schools and made attendance compulsory for children between the ages of six and 14. At this time, the Education Department had "external study" for student teachers, where they taught in the classroom while studying for examinations set by the Department.

The origins of Edith Cowan University date back to 1902 with the establishment of the Claremont Teachers College, the first tertiary institution in Western Australia. Students could gain qualifications through studying at the College, which remained the only place one could do this until the 1950s when the Churchlands and Graylands colleges opened. The function of teacher education did not pass into the university sector until the 1980s. The former Claremont campus is on land between Goldsworthy, Princess and Bay Roads in the western Perth suburb of Claremont.  It is a large two storey limestone building set in extensive grounds, with a distinctive square crenellated tower, and was entered in the Register of the National Estate in 1987.

Over time, other teacher training colleges were formed, including Graylands Teachers College (GTC) in 1955, the Western Australian Secondary Teachers College (WASTC) in 1967 that was renamed Nedlands College of Advanced Education (NCAE) on 1 January 1979, Mount Lawley Teachers College (MLTC) in 1970 and Churchlands Teachers College in 1972. The Graylands Teachers College in 1977 was recommended by the Commonwealth Government for closure at the end of 1979, to be merged into Churchlands, Mount Lawley and Claremont.

On 11 December 1981, the Claremont Teachers College, Nedlands College of Advanced Education, Mount Lawley College of Advanced Education and Churchlands College of Advanced Education amalgamated to form the Western Australian College of Advanced Education (WACAE, or colloquially wacky), with campuses in Churchlands, Claremont, Mount Lawley and Nedlands. A new Bunbury campus started taking in students in 1986, and a new Joondalup campus in 1987. During the 1980s, Western Australia's first nursing education program was also established.

The Claremont Teachers College's last Director was Thomas Ryan (1924-2002), who completed his teacher training at the College and graduated in 1947. He was appointed Vice-Principal of the College in 1972, a position he held until his appointment as Director of the College in 1980.

In 1989, WACAE underwent an independent review led by the former University of Melbourne vice chancellor David Caro in the form of the Caro Committee, which included Roy Lourens who later became vice chancellor of Edith Cowan University. WACAE was granted university status on 1 January 1991 and changed its name to Edith Cowan University after Edith Dircksey Cowan, the first woman to be elected to an Australian Parliament. , Edith Cowan University is the only Australian university named after a woman.

Cowan worked to raise funds for students to attend universities in other states, prior to a university being built in Western Australia, obtaining government support for her scheme. Her work in this area was acknowledged by naming Western Australia's oldest education institution and newest university after her, as well as her image being added to the 1995 and 2018 designs (the polymer designs) of the Australian $50 note.

Cowan believed that education was the key to growth, change and improvement and her contribution to the development of Western Australian education was significant. She strove to achieve social justice and campaigned for the rights of women, children and families, for the poor, the poorly educated and the elderly. She promoted sex education in schools, migrant welfare, and the formation of infant health centres, and was instrumental in obtaining votes for women in Western Australia.

In 1991, the university purchased the house that Cowan, her husband and family had resided in for approximately 20 years. The house was reconstructed on the university's Joondalup campus with the assistance of the West Coast College of TAFE, and re-opened in 1997. Edith Cowan House, Building 20 on the university's Joondalup campus, currently plays host to the Peter Cowan Writers Centre.

The original Claremont building continued serving for 16 years as a campus of Edith Cowan University following that institution's formation in 1989. The campus was then acquired by the University of Western Australia and became home to the Confucius Institute, University of Western Australia Press and, until 2021, Taylors College.

Organisation

Teaching schools

The university has eight teaching schools

School of Business and Law
Broad disciplines: Business and Law

School of Arts and Humanities
Broad disciplines: Communication, Arts, Humanities, Psychology, Social Sciences, Social Work, Criminology and Justice

School of Education
Broad disciplines: Teacher education for Early Childhood, Primary and Secondary schools

School of Engineering
Broad disciplines: Full range of Engineering specialisations

School of Medical and Health Sciences
Broad disciplines: Exercise and Health Sciences, Medical Science, Biomedical Science, Speech Pathology and Paramedicine

School of Nursing and Midwifery
Broad disciplines: Nursing and Midwifery

School of Science
Broad disciplines: Biology and Environmental Sciences, Mathematics, Physics, Biochemistry, Computing and Security Sciences

Western Australian Academy of Performing Arts
Broad disciplines: Full range of performing arts and related specialities

Research centres
The university has a number of research centres within its areas of research strength: Health and Wellness; Education; Environment and Sustainability; Electronic Engineering and ICT; Social and Community; Business and Society; Communications and Creative Arts; and Security, Law and Justice. Several of these research centres are categorised as Major National Research Facilities and WA Centres of Excellence in Science and Innovation.

Business and society 
Centre for Innovative Practice
Marketing and Services Research Centre

Communications and creative arts 
Centre for Research in Entertainment, Arts, Technology, Education and Communications
Dance Research Centre - Western Australian Academy of Performing Arts

Education 
Centre for Schooling and Learning Technologies
Edith Cowan Institute for Education Research
Fogarty Learning Centre

Engineering and ICT 
 Australian Institute of Nuclear Science and Engineering (AINSE)
 Centre for Communications Engineering Research
 Electron Science Research Institute
 National Networked Tele-Test Facility for Integrated Systems
 The Western Australian Centres for Microscopy/Nanoscale Characterisation

Environment and sustainability 
Centre for Ecosystem Management
Centre for Marine Ecosystems Research
Natural Resources Modelling and Simulation Research Group
The Western Australian Marine Science Institution

Health and wellness 
Australian Indigenous HealthInfoNet
Centre of Excellence for Alzheimer's Disease Research and Care
Exercise and Sports Science Research Group
Melanoma Research
The Systems and Intervention Research Centre for Health
Exercise Medicine Research Institute (EMRI) 
Western Australian Centre of Excellence for Comparative Genomics

Security, law and justice 
ECU Security Research Institute
Sellenger Centre for Research in Law, Justice and Social Change

Vice-chancellors and chancellors 
Steve Chapman commenced as vice-chancellor in April 2015. Previous vice-chancellors include Kerry Cox (from 2006 to 2014), Millicent Poole (from 1997 to 2005) and Roy Lourens (from 1991 to 1997).

Robert French was the inaugural chancellor (1991–1997). In January 2022, Denise Goldsworthy became the fifth chancellor. Previous chancellors include Robert Nicholson (1997–2004), Hendy Cowan (2004–2018) and Kerry Sanderson (2019–2021).

Governing council
The University Council is the governing body of the organisation which controls and manages the operation, affairs, concerns and property of the university, in accordance with its Corporate Governance Statement.

The membership of the council is composed of people across various disciplines and groups as mandated under Part III, Sect. 9 of the Edith Cowan University Act 1984. Its membership includes persons appointed by the Governor of Western Australia, co-opted members, members of the academic and general staff of the university as elected by the members of these groups, and alumni and student guild representatives. With the exception of the Chancellor and students, members of council are elected for three-year terms, or in the case of a by-election for the balance of the current term. An elected member of the council may serve for up to three consecutive terms, after which they are subject to a twelve-month break before they may be reconsidered for council. Students elected to the University Council hold office for a term of one year from the date their election takes effect, and are not eligible for re-election more than once.

Campuses
ECU has three campuses, consisting of two metropolitan campuses at Joondalup and Mount Lawley, and one at Bunbury, in Western Australia's South West Region. Programs are also offered at regional centres throughout Western Australia.

The Joondalup Campus is the University's headquarters. Facilities on the campus include a new Health and Wellness Building, a multimillion-dollar sport and fitness centre, a new award-winning library and student hub, an outdoor cinema screening Perth International Arts Festival Lotterywest Festival Films during the summer months and on-campus accommodation. The campus also forms part of the Joondalup Learning Precinct, which includes the West Coast College of TAFE to the north and the Western Australian Police Academy to the northeast. It is serviced by the Joondalup CAT and is close to the Mitchell Freeway.

The Mount Lawley Campus is close to the Perth central business district (CBD). Facilities on the campus include extensive media training and performing arts facilities, a sport and fitness centre and on-campus accommodation. The campus also forms part of the Mount Lawley education precinct with Mount Lawley Senior High School, and is home to WAAPA, one of Australia's most successful and well-known arts training institutions.

The South West Campus is located in Bunbury, two hours drive south of Perth. The South West Campus (Bunbury) is the largest university campus outside the metropolitan area and is part of an educational precinct comprising South West Institute of Technology and the Bunbury Health Campus which includes St John of God Hospital and South West Area Health Services. The campus has modern facilities, small class sizes, two vending machines, a cafe, and a common room. In addition, a comprehensive range of courses and on-campus accommodation is available. Many classes have recently been shifted to online to cater to overseas students.

The university formerly also had three campuses in Perth's western suburbsChurchlands, Claremont and Nedlands. These campuses were closed down with the Churchlands Campus becoming a residential estate in 2006, and the Nedlands and Claremont campuses being acquired by the University of Western Australia in 1990 and 2004 
respectively. Graylands was merged into Claremont, Churchlands and Mount Lawley in 1979 before the formation of WACAE, and Churchlands eventually became a residential estate.

In 2014 the university opened the ECU Health Centre on Dundebar Road in Wanneroo. The Centre includes the Wanneroo GP Super Clinic, ECU Psychological Services Centre, pharmacy, and allied health practitioners.

On 20 September 2020, as part of a $1.5-billion "Perth City Deal" between the federal and Western Australian state governments, it was announced that the Mount Lawley campus would relocate to immediately west of Yagan Square in the Perth CBD. It will include all facilities at the current Mount Lawley campus, while Mount Lawley Senior High School is planned to expand into the current WAAPA facilities at Mount Lawley. On 17 December 2021, the city campus project was approved by DevelopmentWA. Initial construction on the site was expected to begin in the second quarter of 2022; construction ultimately kicked off in February 2023 for an intended 2026 commencement of classes, while costs have increased to $853 million.

Academic profile
Study programs are offered at Associate Degree, Bachelor, Master and Doctoral levels in numerous subject areas. Additionally there are number of Vocational education courses offered by Western Australian Academy of Performing Arts and several University Preparation Courses which prepare students for undergraduate study.

The university offers more than 300 courses across its three Western Australian campuses, with some courses also offered for study off-campus (Distance Education).

A significant number of ECU courses are unique to Western Australia and Australia - including Ocean Engineering, Arts Management, Aviation, the Home Economics specialisation in secondary teaching, Design and Technology secondary teaching, a double degree in Nursing and Midwifery, an accredited online Law degree.

The university has partnerships with several education institutions to conduct courses and programs offshore in countries such as China, India, Singapore, Sri Lanka, Vietnam and the United Arab Emirates.

Course Experience Questionnaire (CEQ)
The 2008 national Course Experience Questionnaire (CEQ) reports that 92.1% of ECU's domestic and international Bachelor level graduates were satisfied with the quality of their course, with the national average at 88.5% and the Western Australia state average at 90.0%.
The 2008 CEQ also reports that 89.6% of ECU's domestic and international Bachelor level graduates were satisfied with the teaching experience during their course, with the national average at 82.8% and the Western Australia state average at 85.0%.

Graduate Destination Survey
The 2008 national Graduate Destination Survey reports that 84.7% of ECU's domestic Bachelor level graduates are in full-time employment with the national average at 86.01% and the state average at 87.9%.

Rankings

The 2018 ERA scale ranks ECU 32nd out of Australian universities. The 2022 Good Universities Guide rates ECU five stars, the highest star rating, for teaching quality and graduate starting salary. The 2023 QS World University Rankings listed ECU in the 601-650 band. The 2023 Times Higher Education (THE) Ranking listed ECU in the 351-400 band. ECU is also named in The Times Higher Education (THE) Young Universities Under 50, ranking listed 94 a list of the best universities in the world under the age of 50.

Student life

Enrollment
ECU has more than 31,000 students at both undergraduate and postgraduate levels. More than 6,000 international students originating from more than 100 countries study with ECU each year. This includes the offshore delivery of a variety of courses in a number of countries, student and staff exchange programs with other universities, joint research activities, international consultancies and individual academic links.

Guilds and student associations
All students are represented by the ECU Student Guild. This includes postgraduate students, under the Postgraduate Studies Department, and International students under the International Students' Council.

There are a range of academic groups and associations for undergraduate students of particular disciplines, including: Boomerang@ECU (Advertising); Dead Pilot's Society Superseded by Edith Cowan Aviators (ECA) as found on the social networking site Facebook; ECU Engineers (EEC); ECU Society of Psychology and Social Science (ECUSPSS); Sports Science @ ECU; Town Planning Student Association; ECU Nurses; Society Of Security Science (SOSS); NorthLaw Society (NLS); ECU Public Relations Chapter; Computer and Security Science Association (CASSA); ML Education (Primary Education); Early Childhood Collective and Arts Management Student Organisation (AMSO); Western Australian Student Paramedics (WASP) and more.

Along with the student associations, there are various social and sporting clubs that are affiliated with ECU Sport or the Guild. Some of these include: ECU Cars & Cruises, ECU Badminton Club, Tennis Club, ECU Liberal Club, Jack of Arts, Enactus, Buddhist Youth Club, ECU Parties and Events, Humans vs Zombies, Nerd Space, ECU Cheerleading Club, ECU Quidditch Club, The Sound, Touch Football, Mixed Netball, and more.

Notable alumni
Notable alumni of ECU include:
Ahmed Adeeb, former Vice President of the Maldives
Anne Aly, political scholar and counter-terrorism expert, federal MP for Cowan representing the Labor Party, current Minister for Early Childhood Education and Minister for Youth in the Albanese ministry.
Musa Aman, the chief minister of the Malaysian state of Sabah
Darren Beazley, sports administrator
Donna Burke, singer, voice actress and businesswoman
Tim Clifford, politician representing the Greens WA for the East Metropolitan Region
Alistair Edwards, former Australian international soccer player
Mark Gasser, concert pianist
Lady Edwina Louise Grosvenor, prison reformer
Terry Mills, former Chief Minister of the Northern Territory
Joshua Oigara, Group CEO of the Kenya Commercial Bank Group
Christopher Phillips, writer
Farzad Sharifian, linguist
David Scott; educationist, former headmaster of Kingswood College and Newington College
Gregory Sica, sports writer
Kris Stewart, theatre producer
David Templeman, politician representing the Labor Party in the district of Mandurah
Wilson Tucker, politician
Adam Voges, cricketer
Graham Watt, politician representing the Liberal Party for the district of Burwood
Calan Williams, racing driver
Danielle Wood, writer
Rolf Harris, entertainer
Kevin Penkin, award winning anime and video game music composer

Actors
Hugh Jackman
Frances O'Connor
Jai Courtney
Dominic Purcell
Lisa McCune
Marcus Graham
William McInnes
Lucy Durack
Emma Matthews
Eddie Perfect
Tim Minchin 
Simon Lyndon
Dacre Montgomery

Notable faculty and staff
Anne Aly
Alexandre Da Costa, Associate Professor of Classical Music - Strings
Chris Edmund, former Head of Acting at WAAPA 
Kamran Eshraghian, electronics engineer and expert in the field of VLSI
Mark Gasser
Geoff Gibbs (1940 - 2006), founding dean of dramatic arts and principal of WAAPA
David W. Goodall, believed to be Australia's oldest working scientist
Nanette Hassall, dancer, choreographer and dance teacher
Colleen Hayward, Former Pro-Vice-Chancellor and 2009 inductee into the Hall of Fame at the Aboriginal Awards of Achievement
Cat Hope, Associate Dean of Research at WAAPA
Geoffrey Lancaster, world-renowned fortepianist
Ralph Martins, Chair in Aging and Alzheimers and named WA Australian of the Year for 2010; 
Emma Matthews, Head of Classical Voice at WAAPA
Craig Valli, 2010 Achiever of the Year Award, Western Australian Information Technology and Telecommunications Awards (WAITTA); 
Julie Warn, director of WAAPA
Graham Wood, Dean of Teaching and Learning at the Western Australian Academy of Performing Arts

See also

List of universities in Australia
Perth Institute of Business and Technology

References

External links

 
Universities in Western Australia
Educational institutions established in 1991
Mount Lawley, Western Australia
Joondalup
1991 establishments in Australia